The Second Grace is a Sicilian band based in Palermo. Led by singer, acoustic guitarist, and main songwriter Fabrizio Cammarata, the band — also composed of slide guitarist and keyboardist Fabio Rizzo, bassist John Riggio, and drummer Fabio Finocchio — released its debut album in May 2007 on the label Edel.
The Second Grace's sound is a gentle, folky mixture that draws from Caribbean, American, and English songwriting traditions.

The Second Grace's debut album was released on May, 25th for the label Edel, and the music video for the first single Antananarive gave popularity to the band, being aired on heavy rotation on MTV Italy. The video was shot by Sergi Capellas, and the location was Palermo and the narrow streets of the ancient part of town (Vucciria, Ballarò).

The Second Grace have toured with and opened concerts for Iron & Wine, Devendra Banhart, Carmen Consoli, The Devastations, Dufus between 2005 and 2008.

Discography

Albums
 The Second Grace  (Released May, 25th 2007)

References

External links
Official Website
Myspace page

The Second Grace Interview with Latin American Radio Network ADICTOS AL RUIDO (to be released on 23 August 2010) https://web.archive.org/web/20100927093034/http://adictosalruido.com/

Italian singer-songwriters
Living people
Musicians from Palermo
Musical groups from Sicily
Year of birth missing (living people)